Maria Carmela Espiritu Pangilinan , popularly known as Candy Pangilinan, is a Filipino film and television actress and comedian. She won best actress for CineFilipino 2016 and Los Angeles International Film Festival for the movie Star na si Van Damme.

Television and film career
In the early 1990s, she starred in supporting roles in romantic comedy films such as "Hindi Magbabago" with Carmina Villaroel in 1994 and 1997, Dahil Ba Sa Kanya as a lead role alongside Aga Muhlach, Mikee Cojuangco-Jaworski and Onemig Bondoc and "Sige Subukan Mo" with Ace Vergel and Maricel Soriano. 1998 in "Kung Ayaw Mo Huwag Mo" her second time working with Maricel Soriano and Jolina Magdangal, "Honey, Nasa Langit Na Ba Ako" with Regine Velasquez and in 2000 in "Ayos Na Ang Kasunod" with Fernando Poe, Jr. and Ara Mina. In 2007, she was cast in a comedy film Apat Dapat, Dapat Apat with friends and comedians Rufa Mae Quinto, Pokwang, Eugene Domingo, produced by Quinto with Viva Films and ON Q-28 Productions. In television, she is known for her role in the series Mula Sa Puso until its finale in 1999 she then played side kick to Claudine Barretto's character Rosario in Saan Ka Man Naroroon in 1999 to 2001. I Love Betty La Fea from 2008 to 2009 with a follow up on the Philippine remake of Only You with Angel Locsin, Sam Milby and Diether Ocampo on ABS-CBN and the Critically Acclaimed Series Minsan Lang Kita Iibigin in 2011, in 2012 she did supporting roles for GMA Network such as Forever with Heart Evangelista, Geoff Eigenmann and Gloria Romero, and Hiram na Puso with Gina Alajar and Kris Bernal, she then did notable guest appearances on the hit Saturday trivia-game show Celebrity Bluff alongside Eugene Domingo in 2013. In 2014, she guest starred on TV5 on Sharon, Kasama Mo Kapatid, Beki Boxer, Regal Shocker Presents, Showbiz Police, Face the People and Tropa Mo Ako Unli. In Wansapanataym, the revived TV series back in ABS-CBN in Perfecto and Noreen Capili's My App Boyfie.

Personal life
Pangilinan married at age 31 although she and her husband are currently separated. She has a son named Quentin.

Filmography

Television

Movies

 2020 Tililing
 2020 Hindi Tayo Pwede ... Gabs' mother
 2019 Miracle in Cell No. 7 ... Orphanage Rectress
 2019 Jowable .... Nun
2018 Abay Babes .... Madam Astra
2016 Dukot .... Police Chief dela Vega With Enrique Gil
2016 Lumayo Ka Nga Sa Akin with Benjie Paras
2016 This Time ... Mrs. Buhay With Ex Lovers James Reid and Nadine Lustre
2015 All You Need Is Pag-Ibig ... Grace/Mel's Eldest Sister With Kris Aquino, Derek Ramsay, Kim Chiu, Xian Lim, Jodi Sta. Maria, Ian Veneracion, Nova Villa, Ronaldo Valdez, Pokwang, and Bimby Aquino Yap
2015 Everyday I Love You ... Ninang Beth (Ethan's Godmother) With Enrique Gil, Liza Soberano, and Gerald Anderson
2015 Etiquette for Mistresses ... Joy/Ina's (Eldest Sister) With Kris Aquino, Claudine Barretto, Kim Chiu, and Iza Calzado
2015 La Amigas ... Veronica "Nica" Verallo-Bermudez (Vicky's Cousin)
2014 The Gifted ... Mrs. Tabayoyong With Anne Curtis, Cristine Reyes, and Sam Milby
2014 Talk Back and You're Dead ... Selene Perez
2014 Diary ng Panget ... Mayordoma
2013 Momzillas ... Gracia
2013 Ang Huling Henya … Peachy
2011 Who's That Girl? ... Monique With Anne Curtis
2010 HIV: Si Heidi, Si Ivy at Si V
2010 Petrang Kabayo ... Maita
2009 Ang Tanging Pamilya: A Marry Go Round ... Ka Away
2009 And I Love You So ... Teacher Paula With Bea Alonzo, Sam Milby, and Derek Ramsay
2008 For the First Time ... Josie With Richard Gutierrez and Former Actress -KC Concepcion
2007 Enteng Kabisote 4: Okay Ka Fairy Ko...The Beginning of the Legend
2007 Apat Dapat, Dapat Apat ... Maria Resurrection 'Res' Macabuhay
2006 Binibining K ... Tess
2006 D' Lucky Ones ... Tita Cara
2003 Pakners ... Ceiling
2002 Akala mo ... Beauty
2002 Ikaw lamang hanggang ngayon ... Dina With Richard Gomez and Regine Velasquez
2000 Ayos na ... ang kasunod ... Pilar With Fernando Poe Jr. and Ara Mina
2000 Eto na naman ako ... Silly With Robin Padilla and Vina Morales
1999 Weder-Weder Lang 'Yan ... Nikki
1999 Higit pa sa buhay ko ... Vangie
1999 Mula Sa Puso ... Berta
1998 Sige subukan mo With Ace Vergel and Maricel Soriano
1998 Dahil ba sa kanya
1998 Kung ayaw mo, huwag mo! ... Cris
1998 Honey, nasa langit na ba ako?
1997 Rizal sa Dapitan ... Maria
1996 Medrano
1996 Isa, dalawa, takbo! ... Wet Lady
1996 Impakto ... Melba
1996 April Boys: Sana'y mahalin mo rin ako ... Chuchay
1996 Romano Sagrado: Talim sa dilim ... Lourdes With Monsour del Rosario, Alma Concepcion, and John Estrada
1995 Boy! Gising!
1995 Ikaw pa, Eh love kita ... TV Analyst With Lito Lapid and Maricel Soriano
1995 Isang kahig, tatlong tuka ... (Daddy ka na, Mommy ka pa!)
1995 Manalo matalo mahal kita With Cesar Montano and Mikee Cojuangco
1994 The Secrets of Sarah Jane: Sana’y Mapatawad Mo
1994 Hindi magbabago ... Annette
1993 Johnny Tinoso and the proud beauty
1991 Shake Rattle & Roll III, "Nanay" - Sally

Awards and nominations

References

External links

Living people
Filipino film actresses
Filipino television actresses
Filipino women comedians
Place of birth missing (living people)
ABS-CBN personalities
GMA Network personalities
Viva Artists Agency
Actresses from Metro Manila
Filipino television presenters
People from Quezon City
Filipino women television presenters
Year of birth missing (living people)